The Tsingy Rouge (Red Tsingy) is a stone formation of red laterite formed by erosion of the Irodo River in the region of Diana in northern Madagascar.

It is situated approximately 60 km south of Antsiranana near the town of Sadjoavato.

References and notes 

Diana Region
Rock formations
Tourist attractions in Madagascar